Lloyd Zaragoza (born November 2, 1982) is a Filipino actor and singer.

Personal life 
Zaragoza is a younger brother of singer and actress Jessa Zaragoza and the uncle of Jayda.

Filmography

Television

Film

External links

References

Living people
21st-century Filipino male singers
Filipino male television actors
1982 births
ABS-CBN personalities
21st-century Filipino male actors
People from Metro Manila